Nebet-hetepet (nb.t-ḥtp.t) is an ancient Egyptian goddess. Her name means "Lady of the Offerings" or "Satisfied Lady". She was worshipped in Heliopolis as a female counterpart of Atum. She personified Atum's hand, the female principle of creation, and could also be a title for Hathor, but aside from that had little significance.

References

Egyptian goddesses
Fertility goddesses
Hathor